Ambrose Lake is a coastal lake on the Sunshine Coast at the north end of the Sechelt Peninsula in Sunshine Coast Regional District, British Columbia, Canada. The primary outflow is an unnamed creek to Ruby Lake. The origin of the name is unknown, but was adopted officially on July 28, 1945.

The Ambrose Lake Ecological Reserve encompasses the lake, in part to protect bog landscapes on the northern edge of the lake and along the outlet creek to Ruby Lake, landscapes seldom found elsewhere in southwest British Columbia.

References

Sunshine Coast (British Columbia)
Lakes of British Columbia
Sunshine Coast Regional District
New Westminster Land District